Hexaarylbiimidazole (HABI) is an organic compound and an imidazole derivative. In its natural state, HABI is colorless, but when ultraviolet light breaks one of the bonds in the molecule, it produces a version that is dark blue. The transformation takes ten seconds or longer. By adding naphthalene to the compound, the color transition can be made in about 180 milliseconds. The cyclophane version of HABI reverts to colorless just as fast as the UV light is off.

See also 
 Photochromism

References

Imidazoles
Chromism